Fasciinatiion is the fifth studio album by the American rock band The Faint. It was released in the US on August 5, 2008.

The album is their first full-length album released outside of Saddle Creek and on the new label blank.wav. The album is the first in the band's ten-year history to be written, recorded, produced, art directed and released entirely on their own.

"The Geeks Were Right" is the first single from the album  and was officially released on iTunes at the end of June 2008.

The album was released in Australia through Inertia Music on September 20, 2008.

Track listing

Personnel 

 Todd Fink — vocals, keyboards
 Jacob Thiele — keyboards, backing vocals
 Dapose (Michael Dappen) — guitars
 Joel Petersen — bass
 Clark Baechle — drums, percussion

Notes

External links
The Faint website
The Faint official MySpace

2008 albums
The Faint albums